Trachysphaera lobata, also known as the sand pill millipede, is a species of pill millipede within the genus Trachysphaera and family Glomeridae.

Description 
T. lobata has been recorded to reach lengths up to 4.1 mm long and a width of 1.9 mm wide. Individuals possess 17 pairs of legs. Eyes consist of a row of 4 or 5 ocelli. Young T. lobata are white, however adult are brown in colour.

Distribution 
Trachysphaera lobata is present within the United Kingdom where populations exist in Cornwall, the Isle of Wight and Wales.

It can also be found in France where populations have been recorded in Génis.

Habitat 
Within the United Kingdom T. lobata can be found in woodlands inside soil, leaf litter and dead wood. 

In France T. lobata is found in a variety of sites ranging from woodlands, caves and even a quarry.

References 

Glomerida
Animals described in 1954